The 1962 All-Ireland Senior Hurling Championship Final was the 75th All-Ireland Final and the culmination of the 1962 All-Ireland Senior Hurling Championship, an inter-county hurling tournament for the top teams in Ireland. The match was held at Croke Park, Dublin, on 2 September 1962, between Tipperary and Wexford. The Leinster champions lost to their Munster opponents on a score line of 3-10 to 2-11.

This was the first All-Ireland final to be broadcast live by Teilifís Éireann.

Match details

References

All-Ireland Senior Hurling Championship Final
All-Ireland Senior Hurling Championship Final, 1962
All-Ireland Senior Hurling Championship Final
All-Ireland Senior Hurling Championship Finals
Tipperary GAA matches
Wexford GAA matches